Llewelyn Bredwood (born 30 April 1976) is a Jamaican sprinter. He competed in the men's 4 × 100 metres relay at the 2000 Summer Olympics. Bredwood ran for the University of South Florida in college.

References

External links
 

1976 births
Living people
Athletes (track and field) at the 2000 Summer Olympics
Jamaican male sprinters
Olympic athletes of Jamaica
Place of birth missing (living people)

University of South Florida olympians
University of South Florida alumni
South Florida Bulls men's track and field athletes
21st-century Jamaican people